Hebl is a surname. Notable people with the surname include:

 Gary Hebl (born 1951), American politician
 Mikki Hebl, American psychologist
 Tom Hebl (born 1945), American politician